Veli Pekka Pyykkö (born 12 October 1941) is a Finnish academic. He was professor of Chemistry at the University of Helsinki. From 2009–2012, he was the chairman of the International Academy of Quantum Molecular Science. He is known for his extension to the periodic table of elements, known as the Pyykkö model.

Pyykkö has also studied the relativistic effects present in heavy atoms and their effects in NMR.

Pyykkö model

After the 118 elements now known, Pekka Pyykkö predicts that the orbital shells will fill up in this order:
8s,
5g,
the first two spaces of 8p,
6f,
7d,
9s,
the first two spaces of 9p,
the rest of 8p.
He also suggests that period 8 be split into three parts:
8a, containing 8s,
8b, containing the first two elements of 8p,
8c, containing 7d and the rest of 8p.

The compact version:

Pekka Pyykkö correctly predicted the existence of chemical bonds between gold and the noble gas xenon, which is usually inert; this bond is known to occur in the cationic complex tetraxenonogold(II). He also correctly predicted the existence of gold–carbon triple bonds.

References

1941 births
Living people
People involved with the periodic table
Academic staff of the University of Helsinki
Finnish chemists
Schrödinger Medal recipients
Computational chemists